Fifth-seeded Frank Sedgman defeated Ken McGregor 6–3, 6–4, 4–6, 6–1 in the final to win the men's singles tennis title at the 1950 Australian Championships.

Seeds
The seeded players are listed below. Frank Sedgman is the champion; others show the round in which they were eliminated.

 Jaroslav Drobný (third round)
 Eric Sturgess (semifinals)
 John Bromwich (quarterfinals)
 Bill Sidwell (semifinals)
 Frank Sedgman (champion)
 George Worthington (quarterfinals)
 Colin Long (quarterfinals)
 Mervyn Rose (quarterfinals)

Draw

Key
 Q = Qualifier
 WC = Wild card
 LL = Lucky loser
 r = Retired

Finals

Earlier rounds

Section 1

Section 2

Section 3

Section 4

External links
 

1950
1950 in Australian tennis